The Creditanstalt  (sometimes Credit-Anstalt, abbreviated as CA), full original name k. k. priv. Österreichische Credit-Anstalt für Handel und Gewerbe, was a major Austrian bank, founded in 1855 in Vienna. 

From its founding until 1931, the Creditanstalt was led by members of the Rothschild family, who were among its significant shareholders. Its historically consequential failure in 1931 led to a merger engineered by the Austrian government in 1934, in which it combined with the Wiener Bankverein and the sound parts of the Niederösterreichische Escompte-Gesellschaft to form Österreichische Creditanstalt - Wiener Bankverein, later abbreviated to Creditanstalt-Bankverein. The latter came under the control of Deutsche Bank following the Anschluss in 1938, was nationalized in 1945, and was eventually acquired in 1997 by Bank Austria to form Bank Austria-Creditanstalt, since 2005 a subsidiary of UniCredit. UniCredit phased out the Creditanstalt brand in 2008.

Foundation and development until 1931

The Creditanstalt was founded in 1855 by Salomon Mayer von Rothschild and his son Anselm Salomon von Rothschild, with support from Austrian finance minister Karl Ludwig von Bruck and the financial involvement of notable figures of the Austrian and Bohemian high nobility. It was inspired by the Pereire brothers' Paris-based Crédit Mobilier (est. 1852), and represented a defensive move against the Pereires' aggressive expansion into Europe in competition with the long-established Rothschilds.

The Creditanstalt immediately became the leading bank in the Habsburg Monarchy. It opened its first branch in Prague in 1856. By 1867, it had established further branches in Pest, Brno, Brașov, Lviv, and Trieste, and on that year it sponsored a Hungarian affiliate, the General Hungarian Credit Bank, into which it subsequently merged its prior Pest branch. In 1869 it co-founded the Austro-Ägyptische Bank in Cairo, together with the Anglo-Austrian Bank. Albert Salomon Anselm von Rothschild, Anselm Salomon's son, took control of the Creditanstalt in 1872, and was in turn succeeded in 1911 by his son Louis Nathaniel de Rothschild.

The Creditanstalt's circumstances were dramatically affected by Austria-Hungary's defeat in the First World War, its subsequent dissolution, and the formation of the First Austrian Republic. In 1919, it had to sell its operations in what had become Czechoslovakia to the Prague-based Böhmische Escompte-Bank. Deprived of its international outlook, the Creditanstalt focused on the Austrian market. In 1926, it purchased the Viennese operations of Anglo-Austrian Bank which had become a British bank following recapitalisation by the Bank of England; since that transaction was structured as an exchange of shares, the Bank of England, through its British subsidiary the Anglo-International Bank, became a significant shareholder of Creditanstalt. In 1929, just at the time of Wall Street Crash and under pressure from the Austrian government led by Johann Schober, Creditanstalt purchased its distressed peer the Allgemeine Bodencreditanstalt, which itself was dragged down by its acquisition of Austria's Unionbank two years earlier.

Downfall and merger

Burdened by the troubled legacy of its recent acquisitions, the Creditanstalt declared on  that it was unable to publish its financial statements for 1930, immediately triggering panic. At that time, it represented 27 percent of the Austrian banking sector's total assets, a sum equivalent to 16 percent of the country's GDP, so that there was no option to have it absorbed by another larger banks as had been done with Unionbank in 1927 and Bodencreditanstalt in 1929. This was one of the first major bank collapses that initiated the Great Depression. Chancellor Otto Ender organized a rescue that entailed cost-sharing by the Austrian government, the Oesterreichische Nationalbank, and the Rothschild family, rejecting nationalization plans advocated by the Social Democratic Party. The Creditanstalt's bankruptcy and its impact in producing a global banking crisis provided a major propaganda opportunity for Adolf Hitler and the Nazi Party in which they further blamed the Jews for German and international economic and social troubles.

In 1934, Chancellor Engelbert Dollfuß ordered the Creditanstalt's merger with the Wiener Bankverein and the sound parts of the Niederösterreichische Escompte-Gesellschaft, as a consequence of which the bank became de facto state-owned. The merged entity took the name .

Anschluss and World War II

Following the Austrian Anschluss to Nazi Germany in 1938, the bank was immediately targeted for both financial and racial reasons. By that time, around 36 percent of its capital was held directly by the Austrian government, 12 percent by the Oesterreichische Nationalbank, 16 percent by the bank employees' pension fund, and 7 percent by the bank itself through its subsidiary . On  it was coerced to enter a "friendship agreement" with Deutsche Bank, by which the latter secured a presence in its board of directors. Louis de Rothschild was immediately arrested and imprisoned for the losses suffered by the Austrian state when the bank had collapsed. Deprived of his position and property, he was released upon payment of $21,000,000, believed to have been the largest bail bond in history for any individual, and migrated to the U.S. in 1939 after more than one year in custody. 

Later in 1938, the bank was jointly taken over, without compensation, by German government holding , the Deutsche Bank, and the Reichsbank, which held respectively 51 percent, 25 percent, and 12 percent of its capital. In 1939, its name was abbreviated to Creditanstalt-Bankverein. In April 1942, Deutsche Bank raised its ownership to 51 percent by acquiring a block of shares from VIAG. During wartime, the Creditanstalt expanded its operations into Nazi-occupied Czechoslovakia, Poland, Yugoslavia, and in Nazi-allied Bulgaria. Even though , its former head and still board member during the war, made contact with the U.S. Office of Strategic Services, the Creditanstalt in that period settled the financial issues of several Nazi concentration camps as well as the Aryanization of Jewish-owned businesses, like the re-establishment of Sascha-Film as Wien-Film Limited.

Postwar development

It became mainly a commercial bank and was involved in Austria's economy, holding stakes in important Austrian companies such as Wienerberger, Steyr-Daimler-Puch, Lenzing AG, and Semperit. From 1956 onwards, the Creditanstalt was partly privatized by issuing 40% in shares, though only 10% in common stock. From the 1970s, it restarted an international expansion into central and eastern Europe.

In 1981, the former Social Democratic Minister of Finance Hannes Androsch assumed the office of a general manager, after he had left the cabinet led by Bruno Kreisky. The bank's investments into industrial interests were reduced, while the government's ownership share fell to 51%. In the 1980s, the Creditanstalt opened branches in London, New York and Hong Kong. From 1989 onwards, its international orientation towards East-Central Europe was boosted by the fall of the Iron Curtain. In 1997, Geoffrey Hoguet ceased to work for the investment bank, the last member of the Rothschild family employed in banking in Austria by then.

Merger with Bank Austria and aftermath

In 1997, the Austrian government sold its majority ownership stake in Creditanstalt to Bank Austria (BA), triggering a crisis in the ruling coalition between the Social Democratic Party and the Austrian People's Party - since the Creditanstalt was considered to be part of the Austrian People's Party's sphere of influence under the country's distinctive Proporz arrangement, whereas both of Bank Austria's predecessor entities, the Länderbank and the Viennese Zentralsparkasse, were associated with the political left. In 2001, Bank Austria in turn was acquired by Germany's HypoVereinsbank (HVB), which merged it with Creditanstalt in 2002 to create Bank Austria Creditanstalt (BA-CA). In 2005, HVB was taken over by Italy's UniCredit. After 153 years, the Creditanstalt brand name was finally phased out in 2008, even though it survived in a property subsidiary named CA Immo.

Leadership

 , General Director 1932-1936
 , General Director 1936-1938, Administrator 1945-1948, General Director 1948-1959
 , General Director 1959-1970
 , General Director 1970-1981
 Hannes Androsch, General Director 1981-1988
 Guido Schmidt-Chiari, General Director 1988-1997

Buildings

Vienna

In 1855, the Creditanstalt was temporarily established at Renngasse 1 on Vienna's Freyung square. In 1858, it purchased and demolished a number of houses on  square in central Vienna and replaced them with a new building designed by architect Franz Fröhlich, with allegorical sculptures by Hans Gasser representing Navigation, Railways, Commerce, Industry, Agriculture, and Mining. The building, numbered am Hof 6, was completed in 1860 and was kept in use by Creditanstalt until the 1934 merger. A new building was erected in its place in the early 1950s for electricity utility Verbundgesellschaft, designed by architect .

Between 1915 and 1921 the Creditanstalt had its head office expanded northwestward across  street, on a land plot bordering the Freyung that it had purchased in 1914 from Niederösterreichische Escompte-Gesellschaft, which itself was moving from there to its new headquarters on  2. The opulent neoclassical extension, linked to the former seat by a bridge over Tiefer Graben, became the bank's main headquarters. By 1980 it was the property of the Länderbank which used it for its , successively renamed  (1991-2002),  (2002-2008), and since 2008 again . In 2010, it was acquired by financier René Benko, who repurposed its northwestern wing which became the seat of the Austrian Constitutional Court in 2012, whereas the art forum has remained on the southeastern side.

In 1934, the Creditanstalt-Bankverein established its head office in the former seat of Wiener Bankverein at Schottentor. It remained there through the multiple mergers and restructurings until the late 2000s.

Other locations

In 1894-1896, the Creditanstalt erected a new building for its branch in Prague, designed by architect  with sculptures by Antonín Popp. In 1907-1909 the Creditanstalt erected a monumental branch building in Trieste, on what later became .

See also

 Wiener Bankverein
 Länderbank
 Anglo-Austrian Bank
 Erste Group
 List of banks in Austria

Notes

Further reading
 März, Eduard, Austrian Banking and Financial Policy: Credit-Anstalt at a Turning Point, 1913–1923 (Basingstoke: Palgrave Macmillan, 1984) 
 Schorske, Carl E., Fin-de-Siècle Vienna: Politics and Culture (London: Vintage, 1980) 
 Schubert, Aurel, The Credit-Anstalt Crisis of 1931 (Cambridge: Cambridge University Press, 1992)

External links
 
 

1855 establishments in the Austrian Empire
2002 disestablishments in Austria
Banks established in 1855
Companies based in Vienna
Defunct banks of Austria
Former UniCredit subsidiaries